Sir William Martyn was Sheriff of London in 1484 and Lord Mayor of London in 1492, representing the Skinners. He was made KB.

William Martyn may have been the son of Walter Martyn of Hertford. He owned a pet monkey.

References

15th-century births
16th-century deaths
Sheriffs of the City of London
15th-century lord mayors of London
People of the Tudor period
Knights of the Bath
People from Hertfordshire